Borealopelta (meaning "Northern shield") is a genus of nodosaurid ankylosaur from the Lower Cretaceous of Alberta, Canada. It contains a single species, B. markmitchelli, named in 2017 by Caleb Brown and colleagues from a well-preserved specimen known as the Suncor nodosaur. Discovered at an oil sands mine north of Fort McMurray, Alberta, the specimen is remarkable for being among the best-preserved dinosaur fossils of its size ever found. It preserved not only the armor (osteoderms) in their life positions, but also remains of their keratin sheaths, overlying skin, and stomach contents from the animal's last meal. Melanosomes were also found that indicate the animal had a reddish skin tone.

Discovery and history
 
It was discovered by a miner, Shawn Funk, who was digging in the bank and noticed the specimen. The Wabiskaw Member sediments (belonging to the Clearwater Formation) were being removed to allow mining of the underlying bitumen-rich sands of the McMurray Formation when an excavator struck the fossil. Noting the unusual nature of the exposed fragments, the operators alerted the Royal Tyrrell Museum of Palaeontology. In accordance with Suncor's mining permit and Alberta fossil law, the specimen became the property of the Alberta government.

On March 23, Royal Tyrrell Museum scientist Donald Henderson and senior technician Darren Tanke were brought to the mine to examine the specimen, which, based on photographs, they expected to be a plesiosaur or another marine reptile, as no land animals had ever been discovered in the oil sands previously. Upon correct identification, which was made on-site by Tanke, Henderson was astonished to learn that it was an ankylosaurian dinosaur and not a marine reptile. The animal had apparently been washed out to sea after death.

After three days of mine safety training, museum staff and Suncor employees began working to recover all pieces of the fossil. The process took fourteen days in total.

As the major piece of rock containing the fossil was being lifted out, it broke under its own weight into several pieces. Museum staff salvaged the specimen by wrapping and stabilizing the pieces in plaster, after which they were able to successfully transport them to the Royal Tyrell Museum. There, technician Mark Mitchell spent six years removing the adhering rock and preparing the fossil for study, which was sponsored by the National Geographic Society. The species B. markmitchelli was named for him in recognition of his skilled work. The specimen was put on public exhibit on May 12, 2017, as part of the Royal Tyrrell Museum's "Grounds for Discovery" exhibition, along with other specimens discovered via industrial activity.

Description
 
The Suncor specimen is remarkable for its three-dimensional preservation of a large, articulated dinosaur complete with soft tissue. While many small dinosaurs have been preserved with traces of soft tissues and skin, they are usually flattened and compressed during fossilization. Similar-looking hadrosaurid "mummies" have a shriveled, desiccated appearance due to their partial mummification prior to fossilization. The Suncor specimen, however, appears to have sunk upside-down onto the sea floor shortly after its death, causing the top half of the body to be quickly buried with minimal distortion. The result is a specimen that preserves the animal almost as it would have looked in life, without flattening or shriveling.

The Suncor specimen preserved numerous closely spaced rows of small armor plates, or osteoderms, lining the top and sides of its broad body. It had a straight tail rather than a tail club, and from the shoulders protruded a pair of long spines, shaped like the horns of a bull. Study of the pigments present in remnants of skin and scales suggest that it might have had a reddish-brown coloration in life, with a countershaded pattern that was used for camouflage.

Classification

 
Borealopelta was classified by Brown et al. within Nodosauridae. In the phylogenetic analysis conducted by the authors, Borealopelta nested within nodosaurids more derived than Nodosaurus. The completed cladogram was a strict consensus in 480 different trees, each with slightly different results. In both strict consensus and majority rules cladograms Borealopelta nested with Pawpawsaurus and Europelta in a group of Albian nodosaurs, with Hungarosaurus being the next closest taxon. The phylogeny below displays the results of the strict consensus, excluding taxa outside Nodosauridae.

Paleobiology
 
The discovery that Borealopelta possessed camouflage coloration indicates that it was under threat of predation, despite its large size, and that the armor on its back was primarily used for defensive rather than display purposes. Additionally, the spikes of Borealopelta might have had a dual function as defensive weapons and potential display structures useful in attracting mates and in species recognition.

Diet
Examination of the specimen's stomach contents indicates that ferns were a major part of the animal's diet. The fact that ferns made up the majority of Borealopelta's last meal suggested that it was a highly selective feeder. Roughly six percent of the stomach contents contained charcoal as well, leading to the conclusion that Borealopelta was feeding in an area that was experiencing regrowth after a recent wildfire. Brown and colleagues inferred that the ferns themselves had been halfway through their growing season when ingested, suggesting that the Borealopelta individual ingested them in early or mid-summer, dying only a few hours afterward.

Paleoecology
 
The Suncor Borealopelta was preserved in the marine sandstones and shales of the Wabiskaw Member of the Clearwater Formation, which were laid down during the Albian stage of the Early Cretaceous period, about 110–112 million years ago. At that time, the region was covered by the Western Interior Seaway, an inland sea that stretched from the Arctic Ocean to the Gulf of Mexico, and the Wabiskaw sediments were being deposited in an offshore marine environment.

The holotype specimen of Borealopelta must have been washed out to sea, perhaps during a flood. Initially, it was thought that it had bloated after death and floated on its back at the surface of the water for weeks before the eventual release of the built-up gases within the trunk region of the carcass at which point it sank. Larramendi and colleagues in 2020 doubted this hypothesis, as ankylosaurians would need a density comparable to modern birds for this to occur which is most certainly not the case; instead, it is thought that the animal was washed out to sea where it drowned after struggling to stay near the surface and then proceeded to sink.

The fact that ankylosaurians are front-heavy is probably what led to the animal being fossilized upside down. It landed on the seabed on its back with enough force to deform the immediately underlying sediments. About  of sediment settled over the carcass prior to the release of body fluids, as evidenced by fluid-escape structures preserved in the sediments, and the body cavity became filled with sand. A siderite concretion began to form around the carcass shortly after its arrival on the seabed, which prevented scavenging and preserved the body intact, with its scales and osteoderms in their original configuration.

See also
 Timeline of ankylosaur research
2017 in archosaur paleontology

References

External links

 "Adrift at sea in the Early Cretaceous – the Fort McMurray armoured dinosaur" (video) – Donald Henderson for Royal Tyrrell Museum Speaker Series, 2012

Cretaceous Canada
Fossils of Canada
Paleontology in Alberta
Nodosaurids
Early Cretaceous dinosaurs of North America
Fossil taxa described in 2017
Ornithischian genera